The Eastern Professional Soccer League season ran from Fall 1928 to Spring 1929 with a mid winter break.  By the end of the first half, only the New York Giants and New York Hakoah had played all eighteen games.  New York Celtic had dropped out after eight games and the rest of the teams had played either fourteen or fifteen games. Bethlehem Steel led the league with twenty-eight points off a 14–1–0 record.  The second half of the season began with a different line up than the first half.  Celtic, as already mentioned, had dropped out.  New York Hungaria joined the league from the Southern New York Soccer Association and New Bedford Whalers joined from the American Soccer League. Whalers lasted only eight games before returning to the ASL.  Newark Skeeters played nine games then also dropped out.  At the end of the Spring half, Bethlehem led the league with 49 points, taking the league championship.

League standings
                 First Half   (as of 12/28/28)
                          GP   W   L   D  Pts.  Pct.
 Bethlehem Steel          15  14   1   0    28  .933
 New York Giants          18  11   5   2    24  .667
 New York Hakoah          18  10   4   4    24  .667
 Newark Skeeters          14   3   6   5    11  .393
 IRT Rangers              15   5   9   1    11  .367
 Philadelphia Centennials 14   3   7   5    10  .357
 New York Hispano         14   2  10   2     6  .214
 New York Celtics          8   0   6   2     2  .125

                Second Half (as of 4/29/1929)
                          GP   W   L   T  GF  GA  PTS
 New York Hakoah          18  12   2   4  68  23   28
 Bethlehem Steel          15   9   2   4  41  21   22
 IRT Rangers              13   7   5   1  30  30   15
 New York Hungaria        16   6   8   2  31  44   14
 New York Giants          15   6   8   1  52  24   13
 New Bedford Whalers       8   6   1   1  26  14   13
 New York Hispano         16   4  11   1  36  49    9
 Philadelphia Centennials 12   3   9   0  24  50    6
 Newark Skeeters           9   0   7   2   9  30    2
 New York Celtics         (Disbanded after two months)

References

Eastern Professional Soccer League (1928–29) seasons
Eastern